Kisugi is a Japanese surname. Notable people with the surname include:

Takao Kisugi, singer/composer
Etsuko Kisugi, Takao's sister and a lyricist

Fictional characters
Ai, Hitomi, and Rui Kisugi, the protagonists of Cat's Eye
Hiroto Kisugi of Otogi-Jūshi Akazukin
Makiko Kisugi (also known as Fear Ghoul) a doctor in Boogiepop at Dawn
Teppei Kisugi of Captain Tsubasa

Japanese-language surnames